This is a list of Bien de Interés Cultural landmarks in the Province of Pontevedra, Spain.

 Basilica of Saint Mary Major (Pontevedra)
 Castle of Soutomaior
 Castro of Santa Trega
 Church of the Pilgrim Virgin, Pontevedra
 Convento e Iglesia de San Francisco (Pontevedra)
 Monastery of Santa María de Aciveiro
 Monastery of Carboeiro
 Mosteiro Beneditino de San Bieito de Lérez, Pontevedra
 Royal Monastery of Santa María de Oia
 Ruins of San Domingos, Pontevedra
 Ruínas del Convento de Santo Domingo
 Torres de Oeste
 Tui Cathedral

References 

 
Pontevedra